St. Bernard's Church, or similar, may refer to:

in Gibraltar
St. Bernard's Church, Gibraltar, a symbol of Roman Catholicism in Gibraltar

in the Netherlands
Saint Bernard Church (Ubachsberg), monumental church, Ubachsberg, Limburg

in the United States
(by state then city)
St. Bernard Church (Rockville, Connecticut)
Saint Bernard Church (Alpena, Michigan), a Michigan State Historic Site
Church of St. Bernard (Saint Paul, Minnesota)
St. Bernard's Church and Parish House, Bernardsville, New Jersey, NRHP-listed
Church of St. Bernard (Manhattan), a former Roman Catholic parish which combined with the Church of Our Lady of Guadalupe (Manhattan).
St. Bernard's Church (Akron, Ohio), listed on the NRHP in Akron, Ohio
St. Bernard's Catholic Church (Burkettsville, Ohio), listed on the NRHP in Mercer County, Ohio as St. Bernard Catholic Church and Rectory
St. Bernard's Catholic Church (Hoven, South Dakota), listed on the NRHP in Potter County, South Dakota
St. Bernard Church and Cemetery, Camden, West Virginia, NRHP-listed

See also
Saint Bernard (disambiguation)